Kieron James Nathan Cadogan (born 16 August 1990) is an English professional footballer who plays for Sevenoaks Town as a right winger or forward.

Club career

Crystal Palace
Cadogan came through the Crystal Palace Academy where he caused a stir as an effective right winger as his considerable skill and crossing ability made him a formidable opponent for full backs. He became a regular for the Crystal Palace Reserve side and scored his first hat-trick against Lewes Reserves. In a pre-season friendly on 14 July 2008 away to Aldershot Town, Cadogan was tackled in the final kick of the game, fracturing his ankle and was out injured for 11 weeks. Regardless, he so impressed manager Neil Warnock, that he was offered a professional contract which he signed within days of his 18th birthday. In Cadogan's first professional league match for Crystal Palace on 7 April 2009 against Coventry City, when having only been on the pitch 10 minutes, after a through ball from Victor Moses, Cadogan rounded the keeper and scored in the 72nd minute. Cadogan made a further three appearances that season from the bench. He also played for the reserves where he scored a further 17 goals alongside 11 assists. He finished top goal scorer for the Totesport.com Central Division.

The following season Cadogan went on a month loan to League 2 side Burton Albion where he made three appearances.

In 2010–11 Cadogan, alongside his teammate Wilfried Zaha had a full pre-season with the Crystal Palace first team, going on tour and playing pre-season friendlies stamping their place as a part of the squad. Cadogan had a particularly impressive game against Brentford the week before the championship campaign opened, scoring a goal and showing his quality against league opposition under the eyes of the new manager. Cadogan then went on to start the first game of the season for Crystal Palace making his full debut under George Burley in the 3–2 win against Leicester City, assisting Darren Ambrose's goal. On 24 August 2010, in the second round of the League Cup game away to Portsmouth where Edgar Davids made his Crystal Palace debut, Cadogan came off the bench in the 68th minute. His cross forced Portsmouth's Ibrahima Sonko to score an own goal bringing the result to 1–1 forcing the game into extra time and then to penalties. Although Cadogan scored in the penalty shoot out, Crystal Palace went on to lose the game (4–3) on penalties.

On 2 October 2010, Cadogan scored his second senior goal for Crystal Palace in the 1–2 defeat to Queens Park Rangers, then managed by the man who had given him his professional contract, Neil Warnock. On scoring his goal, Cadogan celebrated with a number of young Crystal Palace players on the pitch at the time by doing 'The Eagle Skank' – a dance some of the younger Crystal Palace players had made up whilst on holiday in Greece earlier that summer.

In May 2011, lifelong Crystal Palace fan Dean Williams used the image of Cadogan's celebration in a billboard campaign entitled 'Born in South London'. The billboards, also featuring teammates Sean Scannell and Nathaniel Clyne, advertised the graduates born in South London who had come through the Crystal Palace academy.

In the 2011–12 season, after featuring in just two games for Crystal Palace, he was loaned out to League Two side Rotherham United in January to continue his footballing education and gain experience.

On his return to his parent club  on 10 August 2012, it was announced that his contract had been cancelled by mutual consent. Cadogan found first team games at Crystal Palace hard to come by as the team were strengthened for a promotion push into the Premier League.

Aldershot Town
On 29 September 2012, Cadogan joined Aldershot Town on a short-term three-month contract.

On 15 January 2013, after making 15 starts for Aldershot Town and assisting eight goals Cadogan was rewarded with an 18-month extended contract. Manager Dean Holdsworth said "I am absolutely delighted with this signing. Since joining us Kieron has grown in confidence and really adapted to our style of play. His quality of deliveries has been superb and he will improve because he is hungry to do so. I am delighted he has committed to the club". Cadogan showed his quality in assisting strikers from the wing. In particular during an FA cup game on 5 January 2013 at home to Rotherham. Cadogan got a hat trick of assists, setting up all three goals for Danny Hylton. The 3–1 win took Aldershot into the fourth round of the FA Cup for the first time, before eventually going out to Championship side Middlesbrough.

At the end of the 2012–13 season, when Aldershot Town were relegated from The Football League, Cadogan was one of thirteen players to be made redundant in the wake of the club's administration. Cadogan featured 28 times, making 25 starts and the topped the assists chart for Aldershot Town that season.

Barnet
On 5 October 2013, Cadogan joined Barnet. Cadogan left Barnet on 22 April 2014 after making 23 appearances in the league.

GAIS
On 11 August 2014, Cadogan signed a season-long deal with Swedish Superettan club GAIS.

Sutton United
On 27 February 2017, Cadogan signed a  deal with National League club Sutton United. He made his first appearance for the club on 4 March, coming on as a 68th-minute substitute for Maxime Biamou in a 0–0 draw at Barrow, Sutton's first away clean sheet back in the non-League top flight since a 9–0 away victory against Gateshead on 22 September 1990. Cadogan made his full debut on 11 March in a 2–2 home draw against York City and on 14 March, Cadogan scored his first goal for Sutton, a 96th minute consolation goal in a 2–1 home loss to Forest Green Rovers. On 25 March, Cadogan netted his first brace for Sutton in a man of the match performance, scoring the final two goals in a 5–1 defeat of North Ferriby United. After scoring three goals in his first six appearances, Cadogan was voted player of the month for March. He finished the season with five goals in 14 appearances.
On 19 August, Cadogan scored his first goal of Sutton's 2017-18 campaign in a 3–2 away win against Chester.
In the January 2019 Transfer Window Cadogan left Sutton after scoring 3 goals that season. In total Cadogan had notched up 18 goals in his Sutton career.

Billericay Town
On 1 January 2019, Cadogan joined National League South side Billericay Town.

On 28 March 2019, Cadogan signed on loan for National League South side Woking for the rest of the season.

Wealdstone
Cadogan signed for Wealdstone on 10 January 2020.

Kingstonian
In July 2022, Cadogan joined Kingstonian following two seasons with Corinthian-Casuals.

Sevenoaks Town
In January 2023, Cadogan joined Sevenoaks Town.

Career statistics

Honours

Club
Woking
National League South play-offs: 2018–19

References

External links

1990 births
Living people
Footballers from Tooting
English footballers
English Football League players
Isthmian League players
National League (English football) players
Superettan players
Crystal Palace F.C. players
Burton Albion F.C. players
Rotherham United F.C. players
Aldershot Town F.C. players
Barnet F.C. players
GAIS players
Sutton United F.C. players
Billericay Town F.C. players
Woking F.C. players
Wealdstone F.C. players
Corinthian-Casuals F.C. players
Kingstonian F.C. players
Sevenoaks Town F.C. players
English expatriate sportspeople in Sweden
English expatriate footballers
Expatriate footballers in Sweden
Black British sportspeople
Association football wingers